Statistics of North American Soccer League in season 1976. This was the 9th season of the NASL.

Overview
Twenty teams contested the league. The Toronto Metros-Croatia defeated the Minnesota Kicks in the finals on August 28 to win the championship. Tampa Bay finished the regular season with the best record, giving them consecutive titles in three different domestic NASL competitions. Though not in a calendar year, within 12 months they won the Soccer Bowl in August 1975, the NASL indoor cup in March 1976, and the regular season shield or premiership in August 1976. Since NASL teams at that time did not participate in the U.S. Open Cup, this would be the closest one would ever come to achieving any sort of a North American treble.

Changes from the previous season

New teams
None

Teams folding
None

Teams moving
Baltimore Comets to San Diego Jaws
Denver Dynamos to Minnesota Kicks

Name changes
None

Regular season
Pld = Played, W = Wins, L = Losses, GF = Goals For, GA = Goals Against, GD = Goal Differential, BP = Bonus Points, Pts= total points

6 points for a win,
1 point for a shootout win,
0 points for a loss,
1 point for each regulation goal scored up to three per game.
-Premiers (most points). -Other playoff teams.

Atlantic Conference

Pacific Conference

NASL All-Stars

Playoffs
All playoff games in all rounds including Soccer Bowl '76 were single game elimination match ups.

Bracket

First round

Conference semifinals

Conference Championships

Soccer Bowl '76

1976 NASL Champions: Toronto Metros-Croatia

Post season awards
Most Valuable Player: Pelé, New York
Coach of the year: Eddie Firmani, Tampa Bay
Rookie of the year: Steve Pecher, Dallas
North American Player of the Year: Arnie Mausser, Tampa Bay

References

External links
Complete Results and Standings

 
North American Soccer League (1968–1984) seasons
1976
1976 in Canadian soccer